Egawa (written:  or ) is a Japanese surname. Notable people with the surname include:

, Japanese cross-country skier
Hisao Egawa, Japanese voice actor
, Japanese Paralympic swimmer
Tatsuya Egawa, Japanese manga artist
Toshio Egawa, keyboardist and a member of Gerard
Suguru Egawa, baseball analyst and a former pitcher
, Japanese basketball player
, Japanese kickboxer

See also
Egawa Dam

Japanese-language surnames